This is a list of aviation-related events from 2005.

Events 
 The Dutch Transport Safety Board merges with Dutch military accident investigation authorities to for the Dutch Safety Board, which takes over the responsibility for aviation accident investigations in the Netherlands.
 The flight operations of Lauda Air, a wholly owned subsidiary of Austrian Airlines, merge with those of Austrian Airlines. The brand "Lauda Air" survives for charter flights operated by the Austrian Airlines Group.

January
 18 January – The world's largest passenger plane, the Airbus A380, is unveiled in an elaborate ceremony in France.
 29 January – Nonstop flights between mainland China and Taiwan take off for the first time since 1949.
 30 January – A Royal Air Force Lockheed C-130K Hercules C3 is shot down in Iraq a few minutes after takeoff from Baghdad, killing all 10 people on board. It is the British military's largest loss of life in a single incident during Operation Telic.
 31 January – The Belgium-based airline BelgiumExel ceases operations.

February
 3 February – Kam Air Flight 904, a Boeing 737-242, crashes on Chaperi Mountain in Afghanistan's Pamir Mountains at an altitude of  during a heavy snowstorm, killing all 104 people on board.
 9–13 February – The Aero-India show takes place in Bangalore, India
 17 February
Opening of a new international airport in Nagoya, Japan. It is the third Japanese international airport.
Several airlines will have to pay heavy compensation to passengers for flight delays and cancellations under a European regulation.
 20–21 February – British Airways Flight 268, a Boeing 747-436 with 369 people on board, suffers an engine fire during climbout from Los Angeles International Airport in Los Angeles, California. The crew shuts down the engine and opts to continue the flight to its destination, Manchester in the United Kingdom, on three engines. Although the aircraft arrives safely, controversy ensues when the U.S. Federal Aviation Administration threatens to fine British Airways for flying an "unairworthy" plane across the Atlantic Ocean.

March
 Lufthansa acquired their first 11% of Swiss International Air Lines
 5 March – Steve Fossett completes the first non-stop, solo circumnavigation of the world in the Virgin Atlantic GlobalFlyer, completing the trip in 67 hours and 2 minutes.
 6 March – The rudder of Air Transat Flight 961, an Airbus A310-308 carrying 271 people bound from Varadero, Cuba, to Quebec City, Canada, detaches in flight. The aircraft returns to Varadero and makes an emergency landing at Juan Gualberto Gomez Airport without injury to anyone on board.
 11 March
Jetsgo ceases all operations and declares bankruptcy protection.
China's first private airline, Okay Airlines, makes its maiden revenue flight.
 14 March – TAP Portugal joins the Star Alliance.
 16 March – Regional Airlines Flight 9288, an Antonov An-24RV (NATO reporting name "Coke") carrying oil workers on a non-scheduled passenger flight, crashes five kilometers (3.1 miles) from the runway while on approach to Varandey Airport in Nenetskiy Avtonomnyy Okrug, Russia, after the crew allows the aircraft's speed to drop and nose to rise until it stalls. The plane strikes a hill, crashes, and burns, killing 28 of the 52 people aboard (26 of the 45 passengers and two of the seven crew members). Malfunctioning airspeed and angle-of-attack indicators may have contributed to the crash.
 17 March – A judge finds millionaire Sikh businessman Ripudaman Singh Malik and sawmill worker Ajaib Singh Bagri not guilty of conspiracy and murder in the 1985 Air India bombing that killed 329 people.
 23 March – Baku Cargo Terminal was opened and started to operate.
 28 March – Chicago Express Airlines, also known as ATA Connection, ceased operations.

April
2 April – A Royal Australian Navy Westland WS-61 Sea King helicopter engaged in humanitarian assistance after an earthquake on Sumatra crashes on a sports field on the island of Nias in Indonesia. The crash kills nine – six RAN members and three members of the Royal Australian Air Force (RAAF) – of the 11 personnel aboard; one RAN member and one RAAF member aboard the helicopter are injured but survive.
12 April – A GT Air de Havilland Canada DHC-6 Twin Otter 100 aircraft crashes in Indonesia, all 18 on board die.
 19 April – The middle section of the Obelisk of Axum is repatriated from Italy to Ethiopia by air from Leonardo da Vinci–Fiumicino Airport to Axum Airport in an Antonov An-124 Ruslan, the largest and heaviest piece of air freight ever carried up to this date.
 21 April – Oneworld becomes the first airline alliance to enable its customers to fly throughout its members' network on electronic tickets only, with the completion of interline electronic ticketing (IET) links between all its member airlines.

May
3 May – Airwork Flight 23, a Fairchild Swearingen Metroliner crashes in Taranaki, New Zealand killing both crew members.
7 May – Australia experiences its worst air disaster since December 1968 when the Fairchild Swearingen SA227-DC Metro 23 VH-TFU, operated by Aerotropics, crashes into the ridge known as South Pap while on approach to land at Lockhart River Airport in Queensland, killing all 15 people on board.
13 May
A missile strike by an American RQ-1 Predator unmanned aerial vehicle in Pakistan near the border with Afghanistan kills al-Qaeda member Haitham al-Yemeni.
Israel's Civil Aviation Administration becomes the Civil Aviation Authority of Israel.
The landing and takeoff set the world records for the highest helicopter landing and takeoff in history. He repeats the feat following day.
25 May – A chartered Maniema Union Antonov An-28 (NATO reporting name "Cash") aircraft, owned by Victoria Air, crashes into a mountain near Walungu, Democratic Republic of the Congo, about 30 minutes after takeoff. All 22 passengers and five crew members are killed.
29 May – Air Italy begins flight operations. Its inaugural flight is from Turin, Italy, to Budapest, Hungary.

June
4 June – Iraqi Airways makes its first scheduled domestic flight since the fall of Saddam Hussein's regime in 2003, carrying 100 passengers from Baghdad to Basra in a Boeing 737-200.
9 June – After air traffic controllers at Logan International Airport in Boston, Massachusetts, give them clearance to take off simultaneously on intersecting runways, US Airways Flight 1170, a Boeing 737-3B7 with 109 people on board, and Aer Lingus Flight 132, an Airbus A330-301 with 272 people on board, nearly collide on takeoff. Disaster is averted when the US Airways first officer sees the approaching A330, realizes the aircraft could collide if they both become airborne, and pushes the control column forward to keep the 737 on the ground until the A330 passes  overhead. The 381 people on the two planes suffer no injuries.
11 June – The Pacific Islands Civil Aviation Safety and Security Treaty, ratified by several member states of the Pacific Islands Forum, enters into force. It formally confirms the Pacific Aviation Safety Office, which had been formed informally in 2002.
17 June – The CarterCopter becomes the first rotorcraft to achieve mu-1 (μ=1), an equal ratio of airspeed to rotor tip speed, but it is badly damaged in a crash during a subsequent flight on the same day.
27 June – American businessman John T. Walton is killed when the home-built CGS Hawk Arrow ultralight aircraft he is piloting crashes near Jackson, Wyoming, just after takeoff from Jackson Hole Airport due to a maintenance error.

July
 2–3 July – Steve Fossett and co-pilot Mark Rebholz recreate the first direct crossing of the Atlantic by the British team of John Alcock and Arthur Whitten-Brown on 14 June 1919 in a Vickers Vimy biplane.
 16 July – Minutes after takeoff from Malabo International Airport outside Malabo on Bioko in Equatorial Guinea, an Equatorial Express Airlines Antonov An-24 (NATO reporting name "Coke") crashes into the side of a mountain near Baney, killing all 60 people on board.
 26 July – The Irish airline EUjet ceases operations. It is placed into administration on 28 July.
 27 July – United Eagle Airlines – the future Chengdu Airlines – begins flight operations.
 29 July – The United States Army awards a contract for the purchase of 368 Armed Reconnaissance Helicopters (ARH) to Bell Helicopter Textron.
 30 July – John Garang de Mabior, serving as both the first President of Southern Sudan and the First Vice President of Sudan, dies in the crash of the Ugandan presidential Mil Mi-172 helicopter in a mountain range in southern Sudan.

August
 2 August – Air France Flight 358, an Airbus A340-300 with 309 people on board, bursts into flames after skidding off the end of a runway after landing at Toronto Pearson International Airport in Toronto, Ontario, Canada. Everyone on board survives, although 43 are injured.
 6 August – Tuninter Flight 1153, an ATR 72 heading from Italy to Tunisia, crashes into the Mediterranean Sea, killing 16 of the 39 people on board.
 10 August – Copterline Flight 103, a Sikorsky S-76C+ helicopter flying from Helsinki, Finland, to Tallinn, Estonia, crashes into Tallinn Bay and sinks, killing all 14 people on board.
 14 August – Helios Airways Flight 522, the Boeing 737-31S Olympia, crashes into a mountain north of Marathon and Varnavas, Greece, killing all 121 passengers and crew.
It is the deadliest air disaster in the history of Venezuela, the deadliest involving a McDonnell Douglas MD-82, and the third-deadliest involving an aircraft of the McDonnell Douglas MD-80 series. It will turn out to be the deadliest aviation accident of 2005.
 23 August – Attempting a landing in high winds and torrential rain at Pucallpa Airport in Pucallpa, Peru, TANS Peru Flight 204, a Boeing 737-244 Advanced, strikes tree tops and crashes in a swamp, killing 40 of the 98 people on board. Looters steal parts of the wreckage to sell for scrap.

September
Northwest Airlines Cargo joins the Skyteam Cargo airline alliance.
Intercontinental de Aviación ceases operations.
 1 September – Norway's Accident Investigation Board for Civil Aviation and Railways –takes on the responsibility for the investigation of road accidents in Norway and is renamed the Accident Investigation Board Norway.
 5 September
Mandala Airlines Flight 091, Boeing 737-2Q3Adv with 117 people on board, crashes into a heavily populated residential area seconds after taking off from Polonia International Airport in Medan, Indonesia, destroying dozens of houses and cars. The crash is the third deadliest in Indonesian history, killing 100 people aboard the airliner and 49 people on the ground. It injures the 17 survivors aboard the plane and 26 people on the ground. The governor of North Sumatra, Rizal Nurdin, and the former governor, Raja Inal Siregar, are among the dead.
An Antonov An-26B (NATO reporting name "Curl") registered as ER-AZT, owned by Transaviaservice of Georgia and operated by the Galaxie Corporation of the Democratic Republic of the Congo as a Kavatshi Airlines flight under a Georgian airworthiness certificate that had expired in September 2004, strikes a tree, crashes, and burns while landing in fog at Matari Airport in Isiro, Democratic Republic of the Congo, killing all 11 people on board.
 21 September – JetBlue Airways Flight 292, an Airbus A320 makes an emergency landing at Los Angeles International Airport after its nose wheels gets stuck at a 90-degree angle. All 145 people on board survive.

October
 1 October –Baltimore–Washington International Airport in Baltimore, Maryland, is renamed Baltimore-Washington International Thurgood Marshall Airport.
 6 October – A small plane carrying cargo for FedEx, including six vials of research viruses, crashes in downtown Winnipeg, Manitoba, Canada. The only person on board, the female pilot, is killed, but there are no injuries on the ground.
 8 October – Champion air racer Art Vance is killed when his Grumman F6F-5 Hellcat crashes and bursts into flames when he attempts an emergency landing on the median strip of Interstate 40 near Monterey, Tennessee.
 14 October – Air Jamaica Express ceases operations.
 16 October – United States Secretary of Homeland Security Michael Chertoff officially approves the transfer of the U.S. Federal Air Marshal Service from U.S. Immigration & Customs Enforcement to the U.S. Transportation Security Administration. 
 22 October – Bellview Airlines Flight 210, a Boeing 737-200, crashes just after takeoff from Murtala Mohammed Airport in Lagos, Nigeria, killing all 117 people on board.
 25 October – Visa Parviainen jumps from a hot air balloon over Lahti, Finland, in a wingsuit with two small turbojet engines attached to his feet, providing approximately 160 newtons (16 kgf, 35 lbf) of thrust each and running on JET A-1 kerosene fuel. Parviainen achieves approximately 30 seconds of horizontal flight with no noticeable loss of altitude.
 29 October
Ghana International Airlines begins service with an inaugural flight from Accra, Ghana, to London.
Aer Lingus withdraws its last two Boeing 737 airliners from service. Henceforth, Aer Lingus operates an all-Airbus fleet.

November
5 November – At least one AGM-114 Hellfire missile fired by an American Central Intelligence Agency RQ-1 Predator unmanned aerial vehicle strikes a house in Mosaki, North Waziristan, Pakistan, injuring the senior al-Qaeda leader Abu Hamza Rabia and killing his wife, his daughter, and six others.
6 November – Iraqi Airways makes a flight to Iran for the first time since the outbreak of the Iran–Iraq War in September 1980, with service between Baghdad and Tehran using an aircraft operated on its behalf by Teebah Airlines of Jordan.
14 November – Boeing launches the Boeing 747-8.
26 November – Launching from Mumbai, India, 67-year-old Indian aviator Vijaypat Singhania sets a new world altitude record for hot-air balloons, reaching  during a flight of about five hours in a Cameron Z-1600 balloon.
28 November – Boeing makes its last delivery of a Boeing 757 airliner, and Shanghai Airlines becomes the last customer to take delivery of one. Boeing had ceased production of the 757 in October 2004 after manufacturing 1,050 of the aircraft for 54 customers.

December
1 December
The Indonesian airline Awair changes its name to Indonesia AirAsia.
AGM-114 Hellfire missiles fired by an American RQ-1 Predator unmanned aerial vehicle strike a house in Haisori, Pakistan, killing senior al-Qaeda leader Abu Hamza Rabia, his bodyguard, and two boys.
 6 December – An Islamic Republic of Iran Air Force C-130E Hercules crashes into a ten-story apartment building in Tehran, Iran, killing all 94 people on the plane and between 22 and 34 people on the ground. The crash injures 90 other people on the ground.
 7 December – Indian Airlines rebrands itself as Indian.
 8 December – While landing in a snowstorm at Chicago Midway International Airport in Chicago, Illinois, Southwest Airlines Flight 1248, a Boeing 737-7H4 with 103 people on board, goes into a skid on the runway. Its nose gear collapses, and it crashes through a barrier and comes to rest on a road crowded with automobile traffic, striking three cars. The accident kills a six-year-old boy in one of the cars and injures nine other people on the ground and three people aboard the aircraft.
 10 December – Sosoliso Airlines Flight 1145, a McDonnell Douglas DC-9-32, crash-lands at Port Harcourt International Airport in Port Harcourt, Nigeria, and bursts into flames, killing 108 of the 110 people on board and injuring both survivors.
 19 December – Chalk's Ocean Airways Flight 101, a Grumman G-73T Turbine Mallard flying boat, loses a wing due to metal fatigue and crashes into the Atlantic Ocean near Miami, Florida, killing all 20 people on board. It is the first fatal crash for Chalk's Ocean Airways, which had operated since 1917, but its fleet of Mallards is deemed not airworthy and grounded, and the airline goes out of business.
 23 December – Azerbaijan Airlines Flight 217, an Antonov An-140-100, suffers an in-flight systems failure and crashes on the shore of the Caspian Sea near Nardaran, Azerbaijan, killing all 23 people on board.
 26 December – At around 6:00 pm local time, a Piper Aztec, registration N444DA, bound for Providenciales International Airport on the island of Providenciales crashes in shallow water off the coast of South Caicos in the Turks and Caicos Islands. All four people on board (the pilot and three passengers) die.
 31 December – According to the U.S. Federal Aviation Administration, there were 283 incidents of lasers striking aircraft flying over the United States during 2005.

First flights

April
 23 April – Cessna Citation Mustang
 27 April – The first Airbus A380, registration F-WWOW, makes its maiden flight from Toulouse, France.

May
5 May – Dassault Falcon 7X

June
 21 June – First captive flight of Boeing X-37 under the Scaled Composites White Knight

July
 20 July – Grob SPn

September
 30 September – ATG Javelin

November
27 November – Hongdu L-15

Entered service 
December- F-22 Raptor with the 27th Fighter Squadron

Retirements 
 27 July – Lockheed F-104 Starfighter was retired by the Italian Air Force, the final military user of the F104.

References 

 
Aviation by year